Karen Woodbury Gallery was a commercial art gallery in Victoria, Australia that operated from 2004-2016.

History
The gallery was opened in 2004 on the ground floor of 4 Albert Street in Richmond by its namesake director Karen Woodbury. By 2009 the gallery was representing a range of contemporary Australian and New Zealand artists, and to open a second exhibition space expanded to level one of the building. 

By 2013 following rent hikes in her former location, the gallery was one of several in a growing arts hub on Flinders Lane in Melbourne.

In 2015 the gallery participated in an art fair, "Spring 1883", at the Establishment Hotel.

In 2016, Woodbury closed the gallery and began to operate as a fine arts consultant.

Artists
Artists represented by the Karen Woodbury Gallery include Del Kathryn Barton, Cathy Blanchflower, Robert Boynes, Jane Burton, Michael Cusack, Michael Doolan, McLean Edwards, Kate Ellis, Marie Hagerty, Titania Henderson, Sam Jinks, Locust Jones, Elisabeth Kruger, Alice Lang, Rhys Lee, Fiona Lowry, Magda Matwiejew, eX de Medici, Lara Merrett, Jonathan Nichols, Simon Obarzanek, Derek O'Connor, John Pule, Lisa Roet, Kate Rohde, Alex Spremberg, Heather B. Swann, Monika Tichacek and Philip Wolfhagen.

Selected exhibitions
Dinosaur Designs, 2014
Jane Burton, "In Other Bodies", 2014
Peter Booth, 2015

References
 
 

Contemporary art galleries in Australia
Art museums and galleries in Melbourne
Art galleries established in 2004
2004 establishments in Australia
Art galleries disestablished in 2016
Organizations disestablished in 2016
2016 disestablishments in Australia